Jennifer French (born 1971) is an American SKUD 18 Para sailor.

Biography
French was born in Royalton, Ohio. She attended Bridgewater State University and is a member of St. Petersburg Yacht Club  She is married to Tim French and is friends with P. Hunter Peckham, who is a physician at the Functional Electrical Stimulation director and a sail boat racer as well.

French was paralyzed after she damaged her spinal cord while snowboarding in 1998.

She started participating in the Olympics in 2009 at the United States Disabled Sailing Championship, where she earned first place. She took fifth place at Rolex Miami OCR the same year, and first place the following year. Her awards went down from gold to bronze in two years. In 2011, she won a silver medal at IFDS Worlds and a year later went down to bronze at another annual Rolex Miami ISAF Sailing World Cup. At the 2012 Summer Paralympics in London, she won another silver medal for sailing.

Outreach & Advocacy
Jennifer French is the author of the book "On My Feet Again" (published 2012) and a speaker at the 2018 TedX Berkeley conference (https://www.youtube.com/watch?v=tkspAQW_2sQ). In the book she describes her experiences with new technologies intended for individuals with spinal cord injury. She uses the perspective of a participant in a clinical trial to tell the story of an implanted neuro-prosthetic system that enables her to stand up out of her wheelchair and move around on her own feet. She is an avid advocate for equal rights and equal treatment of individuals with disabilities and has presented at numerous technology and medical device conferences to highlight the equalizing effect that technology has in today's world.

References

External links
 
 

1971 births
Living people
Sportspeople from Ohio
Paralympic silver medalists for the United States
Paralympic sailors of the United States
American female sailors (sport)
Date of birth missing (living people)
People from Fairfield County, Ohio
Medalists at the 2012 Summer Paralympics
Sailors at the 2012 Summer Paralympics
Paralympic medalists in sailing
21st-century American women